Lelygebergte Airstrip , is an airstrip on the southwestern plateau of Lelygebergte mountain, Suriname. It was built in the early 1970s by Suriname Aluminum Company, L.L.C. ("") to facilitate their exploration for bauxite.

Charters and destinations 
Charter Airlines serving this airport are:

See also

 List of airports in Suriname
 Transport in Suriname

References

Airports in Suriname
Sipaliwini District